Arenaria pseudofrigida is a species of flowering plant belonging to the family Caryophyllaceae.

Its native range is Subarctic.

References

pseudofrigida